

Class A of local association leagues
Class A of local association leagues (kretsserier) is the predecessor of a national league competition.

Norwegian Cup

Bracket

Final

Northern Norwegian Cup

Final

Replay

National team

Sources:

References

External links
 Norwegian Football 1936
 Oslo Fylke, 1936 in Norwegian Football

 
Seasons in Norwegian football